Alice Abadam (2 January 1856 – 1940) was a Welsh suffragette, feminist and public speaker.

Early life
Abadam was born in London in 1856 to Edward Abadam and his wife, Louisa ( Taylor) Abadam. Her father was the eldest son of Edward Hamlin Adams, a Jamaican-born banker and merchant who made his money overseas before settling in Britain. In 1825 Edward Hamlin Adams bought Middleton Hall in Carmarthenshire following the death of its owner, Sir William Paxton. The Hall was passed down to his son Edward in 1842, who added the old Welsh patronym, Ab, to the family name.

Abadam, by her own account, had a happy childhood and was educated by a governess at Middleton Hall. She was the youngest of seven children, and saw little of her mother who suffered ill-health brought about by post-natal depression. By 1861 her mother was living away from the family in Brighton, and in 1871 was living back at her paternal home in Dorset. Despite living apart, her parents remained married until the death of Edward in 1875.

Her father was a High Sheriff of Carmarthenshire. He held anti-clerical views, but Abadam converted to Catholicism in 1880. A musical upbringing led her to becoming the organist and choir master at St Mary's Church on Union Street, in the centre of Carmarthen. Abadam met Dr. Alice Vowe Johnson, a social worker and they were companions for the rest of their lives.

Work as a suffragette
In 1905 Abadam joined the Central Society for Women's Suffrage. She became a well known speaker and she addressed a number of suffrage societies, including a two-week speaking tour around Birmingham in 1908, and other areas in 'the North' often by bicycle and sketching her experiences.

Abadam had subscribed as an 'independent socialist' to the Women's Social and Political Union (WSPU) and Independent Labour Party manifesto in the 1906 elections, and in 1911, the WSPU newspaper Votes for Women called Abadam 'that well known speaker on social issues'. She attended the Savoy dinner for the release of WSPU prisoners in 1906, but had moved away from the militant movement the following year. Abadam was one of the signatories (including, among others Edith How Martyn, Charlotte Despard, Theresa Billington-Greig, Marion Coates-Hansen, and Irene Miller) to a letter to Emmeline Pankhurst explaining their disquiet on 14 September 1907, and establishing the alternative Women's Freedom League. Abadam then become president first of the Beckenham London Society for Women's Suffrage in 1908, then Norwood and District Women's Suffrage Society in 1913.

Abadam, in 1911, spoke on 'How the Vote will affect the White Slave Traffic'  to the Mansfield National Union of Women's Suffrage Societies, and in the same year when the Catholic Women's Suffrage Society formed, she urged Catholic women to move from local or small charitable works to make join suffrage campaigns to  "influence the lives of millions of their poor and unprotected sisters for the good."  

In Norwich in August 1912, speaking for an hour and quarter, Adadam appealed directly to the Catholic clergy not to abuse their power by promoting 'indifference and uninformed opposition' to women's suffrage, reported in The Tablet,ba Catholic newsletter. Her outspokenness and open criticism of clergy, including Father Henry Day, who opposed votes for women, led to a label for Abadam  as 'arrogant' and 'paranoid' and her followers were called 'Abadamites' in another Catholic publication, Universe. Alice Meynell wrote supportively in The Tablet, "A Tribute to Miss Abadam".

And in Plymouth in 1913, she placed a motion at the Catholic Women's Suffrage Society, that this meeting 'calls upon the Government to extend the Parliamentary franchise to women in the interests of justice, morality and religion.' 

in a 1913 pamphlet, "The Feminist Vote, Enfranchised or Emancipated?”, Abadam wrote more generally on women's rights, that 'The Constructive Feminist has to be no man's shadow. She must be herself – free to the very soul of sex servility. So, and only so, can she save a stricken world.'

Abadam hosted a table including Evelina Haverfield and members of the Actresses' Franchise League and the Women Writer's Suffrage League at the Hotel Cecil costume dinner in 1914.

By 1916, Abadam was chair of the Federated Council of Suffrage Councils. 

In 1920, she founded the Feminist League with a wide debating agenda and lending library on topics related to feminism but also including freemasonry, embryology and witches.

In the 1920s the Catholic Women's Suffrage Society (which had become the St. Joan's International Alliance) promoted the Equal Franchise Bill and celebrated its passing into law in 1928, with a Mass in Westminster Cathedral and a procession of Protestant and Catholic suffragists including Millicent Fawcett, Charlotte Despard, Virginia Crawford, Elisabeth Christitch, Leonara di Alberti, and Abadam (then aged 72).

 Death and legacy 
Abadam was  involved in supporting a Breton order of White Sister nuns escape persecution and settle in Wales. Abadam served on a committee for art at the University of Wales later in her life. She died in Abergwili in 1940 and left her money to her niece, Mary Edith Morris. Abadam also left an education legacy to pay for boarding school for her great niece Margaret Vaughan, who was four years old at her death.

Vaughan said at the centenary of some women getting the right to vote through the Representation of the People Act 1918, that her family's view of Abadam was “Everybody thought she was incredible clever and noble and she gave so much to feminism. I am immensely grateful to her for everything. I feel that she was my major benefactor. Everybody in our family admires her and I still have a collection of paintings of hers which I regularly get out to look at.”  And her own daughter has a glass with 'Votes for Women' inscribed on it.

Some of Abadam's own sketches are published on the website The Sybil.''

Abadam was recognised by the Women's Archive Wales as a feminist, suffragist, orator and author. A blue plaque at 26 Picton Terrace, Carmarthen, Abadam's home from 1886 to 1904 and at the National Botanical Garden of Wales Llanarthney on the site of her childhood home, the former Middleton Hall, was unveiled on 24 November 2018 by Abadam's great-niece Margaret Vaughan,  who ensures that her family's memories of suffragist Alice Abadam lives on.

References

Primary sources

 
 
 

1856 births
1940 deaths
19th-century Welsh people
20th-century Welsh writers
19th-century Welsh women
20th-century Welsh women writers
Welsh feminists
Welsh suffragists
People from Carmarthen
Women's Social and Political Union
Writers from London
Welsh people of Jamaican descent
British pamphleteers
Converts to Roman Catholicism